Château d'Orschwihr is a castle in the commune of Orschwihr, in the department of Haut-Rhin, Alsace, France. It is a listed historical monument since 1988.

References

Castles in Haut-Rhin
Monuments historiques of Haut-Rhin